Inzer is a surname. People with that surname include:

Drew Inzer (born 1979), American football offensive lineman
James C. Inzer (1887–1967), 16th Lieutenant Governor of Alabama
William H. Inzer (1906–1978), Justice of the Supreme Court of Mississippi

See also
Inzer Bass Wyatt (1907–1990), United States District Judge